Todorka Vasileva (born 24 January 1958) is a Bulgarian rower. She competed at the 1980 Summer Olympics and the 1988 Summer Olympics.

References

1958 births
Living people
Bulgarian female rowers
Olympic rowers of Bulgaria
Rowers at the 1980 Summer Olympics
Rowers at the 1988 Summer Olympics
Sportspeople from Pazardzhik